Steven Ormain Cunningham (born July 15, 1976) is an American professional boxer who held the IBF cruiserweight title twice between 2007 and 2011.

Early years and amateur career
A native of Philadelphia, Cunningham gained a reputation as a tough fighter on the streets of Philly, but he began his amateur career while based at Norfolk Naval Station in Virginia.

Cunningham started boxing at the age of 19, and won the National Golden Gloves  title in 1998 as an amateur.

Professional career
Cunningham began his professional career in 2000 with a 19 fight winning streak including a split decision over Guillermo Jones.

On November 26, 2006, he challenged Krzysztof Włodarczyk for the Vacant IBF Cruiserweight Title but lost by a disputed split decision in front of Wlodarczyk's fans in Warsaw, Mazowieckie, Poland. Later, Cunningham challenged Wlodarczyk again in the summer of 2007. With a majority decision in his favor, Cunningham at last won the title.
He stopped undefeated Marco Huck in Germany in December 2007.

Cunningham lost the IBF title against Tomasz Adamek in Newark, New Jersey, on December 11, 2008. He lost the fight via split decision. One judge scored the fight 114–112 for Cunningham, while the other two judges scored it 116–110 and 115–112 for Adamek. Fight was close although Cunningham was knocked down in the second, fourth, and eighth rounds.

Cunningham faced former WBC Cruiserweight Champion Wayne Braithwaite, at the BankAtlantic Center, Sunrise, Florida on the July 11, 2009, and won the fight via a twelve-round unanimous decision 119–109, 117–111, and 118–110. On June 5, 2010, Cunningham regained the IBF Cruiserweight title with a fifth round stoppage on cuts of Troy Ross in Germany. Cunningham returned to Germany to defend his IBF title against challenger Enad Licina on February 12, 2011.

Cunningham vs. Fury 
Cunningham was knocked out in the seventh round by Tyson Fury, a British boxer, in an IBF heavyweight title eliminator on April 20, 2013. Cunningham had the much bigger Fury down in the second round. At the time of the stoppage, Cunningham was winning the fight with 56–56, 57–55, and 57–55. In an interview with Joe Rogan, Fury claimed Cunningham was the toughest opponent of his career.

After being promoted by Kathy Duva and Main Events for several years, he was now advised by Al Haymon. Cunningham was trained by Naazim Richardson.

Cunningham vs. Glowacki 
On April 16, 2016, Cunningham fought Krzysztof Glowacki for his WBO world cruiserweight belt. Glowacki dropped Cunningham four times, twice in the second round, and once in both the tenth and the twelfth round en route to a unanimous decision victory.

Cunningham vs. Tabiti 
On August 26, 2017, Cunningham fought Andrew Tabiti. Tabiti was ranked #4 by the WBC, #9 by the IBF and #12 by the WBA at cruiserweight, while Cunningham was ranked #10 by the IBF at the time. Tabiti won the fight via unanimous decision, 100–90, 97–93 and 97–93.

Cunningham vs. Mir 
Cunningham defeated former UFC Heavyweight Champion Frank Mir by unanimous decision in Mir's boxing debut on April 17, 2021, on the undercard of Jake Paul vs. Ben Askren. Cunningham served as a replacement for Antonio Tarver who was denied clearance by the Georgia Athletic & Entertainment Commission.

Outside of boxing
He joined light-middleweight Boyd Melson, Shawn Estrada, Demetrius Andrade and other boxers in Team Fight to Walk, an organization focused on increasing awareness in boxing of the importance of stem cell research for spinal cord injuries.

Cunningham is a practicing Black Hebrew Israelite.

Professional boxing record

References

External links

Steve Cunningham profile at Premier Boxing Champions
Steve Cunningham - Profile, News Archive & Current Rankings at Box.Live

1976 births
Living people
African-American boxers
Boxers from Philadelphia
Black Hebrew Israelite people
Heavyweight boxers
International Boxing Federation champions
National Golden Gloves champions
United States Navy sailors
American male boxers
Light-heavyweight boxers
World cruiserweight boxing champions
21st-century African-American sportspeople
20th-century African-American sportspeople
African-American United States Navy personnel